James Weir (23 August 1887 – 1959) was a Scottish footballer who played as a left back for Ayr and  Celtic in Scotland and Middlesbrough in England.

Having been brought to reigning Scottish Football League title holders Celtic to replace the veteran Willie Orr, he helped the club to win three further championships in succession from 1907–08 to 1908–10, adding a Scottish Cup winner's medal in 1908 (he also played in the 1909 final in which the trophy was withdrawn after supporters rioted following a drawn replay at Hampden Park) and wins in the Glasgow Merchants Charity Cup (1907–08) and the Glasgow Cup (1909–10). However, Joe Dodds then became the first-choice left back.

After moving to Middlesbrough in 1910, Weir joined up with a former colleague at Celtic Park, Donald McLeod, and was a regular for Boro in his first three seasons then had a more limited role in two subsequent campaigns leading up to the suspension of regular competitions with the escalation of World War I, including the contribution of eight matches in the 1913–14 Football League which brought the club's highest-ever finishing position of third. He later ran a pub in nearby Redcar.

References

1887 births
1959 deaths
Scottish footballers
Association football fullbacks
Celtic F.C. players
Middlesbrough F.C. players
Scottish Football League players
English Football League players
Footballers from East Ayrshire
Ayr F.C. players